Mirzakhil High School and College is an educational institution of Bangladesh.

Location
Mirzakhil High School and College is located in Chittagong district under Satkania Upazila at Sonakania Union at Mirzakhil village.

History
The high school was founded in 1964 by Abdur Rauf. It run as a secondary school in 1982. The institution received permission to teach higher secondary level as per the notification signed by the Deputy Secretary of the Ministry of Education on 10 February 2022.

Management
The school is conducted by a managing committee of various individuals.

Teachers
Mohammad Azizul Haque is the present headmaster of the school. The institution has more than 20 teachers.

Extracurricular activities
Extracurricular activities include Scouts and Girl Guides, as well as yearly cultural competitions.

Achievement
Among the 1500+ student's studies in this school, its yearly result is 92%.

Gallery

See also 
 Satkania Government College  
 Madarsha Union
 Sonakania Union

References

Schools in Chittagong
High schools in Bangladesh
Schools in Chittagong District
Educational institutions established in 1964
Satkania Upazila
1964 establishments in East Pakistan